Trichosea mjobergi is a moth of the family Noctuidae. It is endemic to Borneo.

External links
 Moths of Borneo

Pantheinae
Moths described in 1926